Damascus steel was the forged steel of the blades of swords smithed in the Near East from ingots of Wootz steel either imported from Southern India or made in production centres in Sri Lanka, or Khorasan, Iran. These swords are characterized by distinctive patterns of banding and mottling reminiscent of flowing water, sometimes in a "ladder" or "rose" pattern. Such blades were reputed to be tough, resistant to shattering, and capable of being honed to a sharp, resilient edge.

Wootz (Indian), Pulad (Persian), Fuladh (Arabic), Bulat (Russian) and Bintie (Chinese) are all names for historical ultra-high carbon crucible steel typified by carbide segregation. "Wootz" is an erroneous transliteration of "utsa" or "fountain" in Sanskrit, however, since 1794, it has been the primary word used to refer to historical hypereutectoid crucible steel.

History

Origins 
The origin of the name "Damascus Steel" is contentious: the Islamic scholars al-Kindi (full name Abu Ya'qub ibn Ishaq al-Kindi, circa 800 CE – 873 CE) and al-Biruni (full name Abu al-Rayhan Muhammad ibn Ahmad al-Biruni, circa 973 CE – 1048 CE) both wrote about swords and steel made for swords, based on their surface appearance, geographical location of production or forging, or the name of the smith, and each mentions "damascene" or "damascus" swords to some extent.

Drawing from al-Kindi and al-Biruni, there are three potential sources for the term "Damascus" in the context of steel:

 The word "damas"  is the root word for "watered" in Arabic  with "water" being "ma" in Arabic and Damascus blades are often described as exhibiting a water-pattern on their surface, and are often referred to as "watered steel" in multiple languages.
 Al-Kindi called swords produced and forged in Damascus as Damascene but it is worth noting that these swords were not described as having a pattern in the steel.
 Al-Biruni mentions a sword-smith called Damasqui who made swords of crucible steel.

The most common explanation is that steel is named after Damascus, the capital city of Syria and one of the largest cities in the ancient Levant. It may either refer to swords made or sold in Damascus directly, or it may just refer to the aspect of the typical patterns, by comparison with Damask fabrics (also named for Damascus), or it may indeed stem from the root word of "damas".

Identification of crucible "Damascus" steel based on metallurgical structures  is difficult, as crucible steel cannot be reliably distinguished from other types of steel by just one criterion, so the following distinguishing characteristics of crucible steel must be taken into consideration:

 The crucible steel was liquid, leading to a relatively homogeneous steel content with virtually no slag
 The formation of dendrites is a typical characteristic
 The segregation of elements into dendritic and interdendritic regions throughout the sample

By these definitions, modern recreations of crucible steel are consistent with historic examples.

The reputation and history of Damascus steel has given rise to many legends, such as the ability to cut through a rifle barrel or to cut a hair falling across the blade, though the accuracy of these legends is not reflected by the extant examples of patterned crucible steel swords which are often tempered in such a way as to retain a bend after being flexed past their elastic limit. A research team in Germany published a report in 2006 revealing nanowires and carbon nanotubes in a blade forged from Damascus steel, although John Verhoeven of Iowa State University in Ames, suggests the research team which reported nanowires in crucible steel was seeing cementite, which can itself exist as rods, so there might not be any carbon nanotubes in the rod-like structure. Although many types of modern steel outperform ancient Damascus alloys, chemical reactions in the production process made the blades extraordinary for their time, as Damascus steel was superplastic and very hard at the same time. During the smelting process to obtain Wootz steel ingots, woody biomass and leaves are known to have been used as carburizing additives along with certain specific types of iron rich in microalloying elements. These ingots would then be further forged and worked into Damascus steel blades. Research now shows that carbon nanotubes can be derived from plant fibers, suggesting how the nanotubes were formed in the steel. Some experts expect to discover such nanotubes in more relics as they are analyzed more closely. Wootz was also mentioned to have been made out of a co-fusion process using "shaburqan " (hard steel, likely white cast iron) and "narmahan" (soft steel) by Biruni, both of which were forms of either high and low carbon bloomery iron, or low carbon bloom with cast iron. In such a crucible recipe, no added plant material is necessary to provide the required carbon content, and as such any nanowires of cementite or carbon nanotubes would not have been the result of plant fibres. 
Damascus blades were first manufactured in the Near East from ingots of wootz steel that were imported from Southern India (present day Tamil Nadu and Kerala). The Arabs introduced the wootz steel to Damascus, where a weapons industry thrived. From the 3rd century to the 17th century, steel ingots were being shipped to the Middle East from South India. There was also domestic production of crucible steel outside of India, including Merv (Turkmenistan) and Chāhak, Iran.

Loss of the technique 
Many claim that modern attempts to duplicate the metal have not been entirely successful due to differences in raw materials and manufacturing techniques. However, several individuals in modern times have successfully produced pattern forming hypereutectoid crucible steel with visible carbide banding on the surface, consistent with original Damascus Steel.

Production of these patterned swords gradually declined, ceasing by around 1900, with the last account being from 1903 in Sri Lanka documented by Coomaraswamy. Some gunsmiths during the 18th and 19th century used the term "damascus steel" to describe their pattern-welded gun barrels, but they did not use crucible steel. Several modern theories have ventured to explain this decline, including the breakdown of trade routes to supply the needed metals, the lack of trace impurities in the metals, the possible loss of knowledge on the crafting techniques through secrecy and lack of transmission, suppression of the industry in India by the British Raj, or a combination of all the above.

In addition to being made into blades in India (particularly Golconda) and Sri Lanka, wootz / ukku was imported as ingots to various production centers, including Khorasan, and Isfahan, where the steel was used to produce blades, as well as across the Middle East. Al Kindi states that crucible steel was also made in Khorasan known as Muharrar, in addition to steel that was imported. In Damascus, where many of these swords were sold, there is no evidence of local production of crucible steel, though there is evidence of imported steel being forged into swords in Damascus. Due to the distance of trade for this steel, a sufficiently lengthy disruption of the trade routes could have ended the production of Damascus steel and eventually led to the loss of the technique. In addition, the need for key trace impurities of carbide formers such as tungsten, vanadium or manganese within the materials needed for the production of the steel may be absent if this material was acquired from different production regions or smelted from ores lacking these key trace elements. The technique for controlled thermal cycling after the initial forging at a specific temperature could also have been lost, thereby preventing the final damask pattern in the steel from occurring. The disruption of mining and steel manufacture by the British Raj in the form of production taxes and export bans may have also contributed to a loss of knowledge of key ore sources or key techniques.

The discovery of carbon nanotubes in the Damascus steel's composition supports the hypothesis that wootz production was halted due to a loss of ore sources or technical knowledge, since the precipitation of carbon nanotubes probably resulted from a specific process that may be difficult to replicate should the production technique or raw materials used be significantly altered. The claim that carbon nanowires were found has not been confirmed by further studies, and there is contention among academics including John Verhoeven about whether the nanowires observed are actually stretched rafts or rods formed out of cementite spheroids.

Reproduction 
Recreating Damascus steel has been attempted by archaeologists using experimental archaeology. Many have attempted to discover or reverse-engineer the process by which it was made.

Moran: billet welding 

Since the well-known technique of pattern welding—the forge-welding of a blade from several differing pieces—produced surface patterns similar to those found on Damascus blades, some modern blacksmiths were erroneously led to believe that the original Damascus blades were made using this technique. However today, the difference between wootz steel and pattern welding is fully documented and well understood. Pattern-welded steel has been referred to as "Damascus steel" since 1973 when Bladesmith William F. Moran unveiled his "Damascus knives" at the Knifemakers' Guild Show.

This "Modern Damascus" is made from several types of steel and iron slices welded together to form a billet, and currently, the term "Damascus" (although technically incorrect) is widely accepted to describe modern pattern-welded steel blades in the trade. The patterns vary depending on how the smith works the billet. The billet is drawn out and folded until the desired number of layers are formed.  To attain a Master Smith rating with the American Bladesmith Society that Moran founded, the smith must forge a Damascus blade with a minimum of 300 layers.

Verhoeven and Pendray: crucible 
J. D. Verhoeven and A. H. Pendray published an article on their attempts to reproduce the elemental, structural, and visual characteristics of Damascus steel. They started with a cake of steel that matched the properties of the original wootz steel from India, which also matched a number of original Damascus swords that Verhoeven and Pendray had access to. The wootz was in a soft, annealed state, with a grain structure and beads of pure iron carbide in cementite spheroids, which resulted from its hypereutectoid state. Verhoeven and Pendray had already determined that the grains on the surface of the steel were grains of iron carbide—their goal was to reproduce the iron carbide patterns they saw in the Damascus blades from the grains in the wootz.

Although such material could be worked at low temperatures to produce the striated Damascene pattern of intermixed ferrite/pearlite and cementite spheroid bands in a manner identical to pattern-welded Damascus steel, any heat treatment sufficient to dissolve the carbides was thought to permanently destroy the pattern. However, Verhoeven and Pendray discovered that in samples of true Damascus steel, the Damascene pattern could be recovered by thermally cycling and thermally manipulating the steel at a moderate temperature. They found that certain carbide forming elements, one of which was vanadium, did not disperse until the steel reached higher temperatures than those needed to dissolve the carbides. Therefore, a high heat treatment could remove the visual evidence of patterning associated with carbides but did not remove the underlying patterning of the carbide forming elements; a subsequent lower-temperature heat treatment, at a temperature at which the carbides were again stable, could recover the structure by the binding of carbon by those elements and causing the segregation of cementite spheroids to those locations. Thermal cycling after forging allows for the aggregation of carbon onto these carbide formers, as carbon migrates much more rapidly than the carbide formers. Progressive thermal cycling leads to the coarsening of the cementite spheroids via Ostwald ripening.

Anosov, Wadsworth and Sherby: bulat 
In Russia, chronicles record the use of a material known as bulat steel to make highly valued weapons, including swords, knives, and axes. Tsar Michael of Russia reportedly had a bulat helmet made for him in 1621. The exact origin or the manufacturing process of the bulat is unknown, but it was likely imported to Russia via Persia and Turkestan, and it was similar and possibly the same as Damascus steel. Pavel Petrovich Anosov successfully reproduced the process in the mid-19th century. Wadsworth and Sherby also researched  the reproduction of bulat steel and published their results in 1980.

Additional research 
A team of researchers based at the Technical University of Dresden that used x-rays and electron microscopy to examine Damascus steel discovered the presence of cementite nanowires and carbon nanotubes. Peter Paufler, a member of the Dresden team, says that these nanostructures are a result of the forging process.

Sanderson proposes that the process of forging and annealing accounts for the nano-scale structures.

In gunmaking 
Prior to the early 20th century, all shotgun barrels were forged by heating narrow strips of iron and steel and shaping them around a mandrel. This process was referred to as "laminating" or "Damascus". These types of barrels earned a reputation for weakness and were never meant to be used with modern smokeless powder, or any kind of moderately powerful explosive. Because of the resemblance to Damascus steel, higher-end barrels were made by Belgian and British gun makers. These barrels are proof marked and meant to be used with light pressure loads. Current gun manufacturers make slide assemblies and small parts such as triggers and safeties for Colt M1911 pistols from powdered Swedish steel resulting in a swirling two-toned effect; these parts are often referred to as "Stainless Damascus".

Cultural references 
The blade that Beowulf used to kill Grendel's mother in the story Beowulf was described in some Modern English translations as "damascened".

The exceptionally strong fictional Valyrian steel mentioned in George R. R. Martin's book series A Song of Ice and Fire, as well as its television adaptation Game of Thrones, appears to have been inspired by Damascus steel, but with a magic twist. Just like Damascus/Wootz steel, Valyrian steel also seems to be a lost art from an ancient civilization. Unlike Damascus steel, however, Valyrian steel blades require no maintenance and cannot be damaged through normal combat.

Damascus steel is also a special finish for the SG 553, along with many knives in Counter Strike: Global Offensive.

In Call of Duty: Modern Warfare (2019) and Call of Duty: Mobile, iridescent blue and red Damascus steel weapon camouflage is available for players who have unlocked all other camouflages for every base weapon in the game.

See also 
Toledo steel
Wootz steel
Noric steel
Bulat steel
Tamahagane steel
Mokume-gane
Laminated steel blade
Tungsten carbide

References

External links 
"Damascene Technique in Metal Working"

John Verhoeven: Mystery of Damascus Steel Swords Unveiled

Steels
Steelmaking
History of Damascus
Metalworking
Lost inventions
Arab inventions